The hoplites were Ancient Greek soldiers.

Hoplite or Hoplites may also refer to:
 Hoplites (river), a river in Ancient Greece
 Hoplites (ammonite), a genus of molluscs
 Hoplite (video game), a 2013 video game
 Operation Hoplite, a 2007 military operation
 Mil Mi-2 (NATO reporting name: Hoplite), a helicopter

See also 
 Hoplitis, a genus of bees